An idiom is a common word or phrase with a figurative, non-literal meaning that is understood culturally and differs from what its composite words' denotations would suggest; i.e. the words together have a meaning that is different from the dictionary definitions of the individual words (although some idioms do retain their literal meanings – see the example "kick the bucket" below). By another definition, an idiom is a speech form or an expression of a given language that is peculiar to itself grammatically or cannot be understood from the individual meanings of its elements.  For example, an English speaker would understand the phrase "kick the bucket" to mean "to die" and also to actually kick a bucket.  Furthermore, they would understand when each meaning is being used in context.

To evoke the desired effect in the listener, idioms require a precise replication of the phrase: not even articles can be used interchangeably (e.g. "kick a bucket" only retains the literal meaning of the phrase but not the idiomatic meaning).

Idioms should not be confused with other figures of speech such as metaphors, which evoke an image by use of implicit comparisons (e.g., "the man of steel"); similes, which evoke an image by use of explicit comparisons (e.g., "faster than a speeding bullet"); or hyperbole, which exaggerates an image beyond truthfulness (e.g., "more powerful than a locomotive").  Idioms are also not to be confused with proverbs, which are simple sayings that express a truth based on common sense or practical experience.

Notable idioms in English

See also

 List of 19th-century English-language idioms
 List of proverbial phrases
 Siamese twins (linguistics)
 wikt:Category:English idioms
 Cliché

Notes

References

 
English grammar
Lists of English phrases